Njord Valley is a high, mainly ice-free valley, 2 nautical miles (3.7 km) long, located east of Oliver Peak in the Asgard Range, Victoria Land. The New Zealand Antarctic Place-Names Committee (NZ-APC) approved the name in 1982 from a proposal by G.G.C. Claridge, soil scientist with the DSIR, New Zealand. One of several names in Asgard Range from Norse mythology; Njord being the father of the goddess Freya.

Valleys of Victoria Land
McMurdo Dry Valleys